The Spiders is a German silent two-part adventure film written and directed by Fritz Lang. It was released in two parts in 1919 and 1920. Two more parts were originally planned but never made. It was believed to be a lost film, but it has been rediscovered and restored.

Plot

Part 1. Der goldene See ("The Golden Lake"):
In San Francisco, well-known sportsman, adventurer and traveller Kay Hoog announces to his club that he has found a message in a bottle with a map drawn by a Harvard professor who has gone missing. The message tells of a lost Incan civilization that possesses an immense treasure. Hoog starts an expedition to find the treasure, while the crime syndicate "Die Spinnen" sends out a rival expedition led by the beautiful but dangerous Lio Sha. At the Golden Lake, Hoog saves the Inca priestess Naela and falls in love with her. He takes her home with him after discovering a mysterious clue about a diamond ship. Back in San Francisco, Lio Sha declares her love for Hoog but he rejects her in favour of Naela. Lio Sha has Naela murdered and Kay Hoog swears revenge.

Part 2. Das Brillantenschiff ("The Diamond Ship"):
The search is on for a Buddha-head shaped diamond that has special powers. Carried in the hands of 'a princess' it will bestow the power to rule Asia. In San Francisco, Hoog discovers a hidden city underneath Chinatown but he is found out and taken prisoner. Eventually the hunt brings Kay Hoog to England, where the Spiders kidnap Ellen, daughter of diamond king Terry whom they suspect of owning the stone. When Kay Hoog arrives on the scene, he and Terry discover (with the help of an ancient log book) that Terry's pirate ancestor concealed a map in a painting. Hoog follows the map to the Falkland Islands to find the diamond, but Fourfinger-John, who has spied on Terry and Hoog, manages to inform the Spiders by carrier pigeon. Lio Sha and her henchmen catch up with Hoog in the cave where the pirate treasure is hidden and take him prisoner. However, poisonous fumes from a volcano enter the cave and all the criminals die. Only Kay Hoog manages to escape with the stone. Back in England, he works with the police and Terry to free Ellen from the clutches of the Spiders' hypnotist master.

Cast

Part 1
 Carl de Vogt as Kay Hoog
 Lil Dagover as Sun Priestess Naela
 Ressel Orla as Lio Sha
 Georg John as Dr. Telphas
 Rudolf Lettinger as diamond king John Terry
  as Fourfinger-John
 Paul Morgan as diamond expert
 Meinhardt Maur as book worm
 Friedrich Kühne	

Part 2
 Carl de Vogt as Kay Hoog
 Ressel Orla as Lio Sha
 Reiner Steiner as captain of the diamond ship
 Georg John as Dr. Telphas
 Rudolf Lettinger as diamond king John Terry
 Thea Zander as Ellen Terry
 Friedrich Kühne as Yogi All-hab-mah
  as Fourfinger-John
 Meinhardt Maur as Chinese
 Paul Morgan as Jew

Production
Fritz Lang was early in his directorial career when he accepted an assignment to direct what was to be a mystery-action film series comprising four feature-length episodes. Lang was forced by this assignment to relinquish the directorial duties of The Cabinet of Dr. Caligari, which was also released by the distributor Decla-Bioscop AG in 1919.

Filming took place from June to August 1919 in Hamburg at Tierpark Hagenbeck for part 1. Part 2 was shot October to December 1919 in Hamburg (Tierpark Hagenbeck and others) and at the Weissensee Studios in Berlin.

Lang completed two episodes before the project was cut short by the films’ producer. Part 1 was released as The Golden Lake (Die Spinnen, 1. Teil: Der Goldene See) and part two as The Diamond Ship (Die Spinnen, 2. Teil: Das Brillantenschiff). Part 1 premiered on 3 October 1919 at the Richard-Oswald-Lichtspiele in Berlin, Max Josef Bojakowski was the conductor. Part 2 premiered on 6 February 1920 at Theater am Moritzplatz, Berlin.

Planned, but not produced (working titles):
Part 3. Um Asiens Kaiserkrone ("To Asia's Imperial Crown")
Part 4. Im Spinnennetz ("In the Spider Web")

Restoration
The Spiders was considered a lost film for many years before an original print was discovered in the 1970s. This surviving print was used for a restoration of the film, completed in 1978. The restored version appears to be missing a small amount of the original footage. This version was released on DVD in 1999 and Blu-ray in 2016.

The three year reconstruction was done by film historians David and Kimberly Shepard, with music scored by Gaylord Carter.  The source material was a 35mm duplicate negative from Czechoslovakia; the nitrate print had several defects that could not be taken out, was out of sequence and didn't have intertitles.   The intertitles were obtained from German censor records.  The film was tinted according to instructions by Fritz Lang, who was still living at the time.

See also
List of rediscovered films
In film and television section of Cultural depictions of spiders

References

External links
 Filmhistoriker.de (German), additional credits and Decla advertising materials 

The Spiders at Silentera.com

1919 films
1920 films
German silent feature films
German adventure films
German black-and-white films
Films of the Weimar Republic
Films shot in Hamburg
Films directed by Fritz Lang
1920s adventure films
Films with screenplays by Fritz Lang
1920s rediscovered films
Films produced by Erich Pommer
Films released in separate parts
Rediscovered German films
Silent adventure films
Films shot at Weissensee Studios
1920s German films
1910s German films